Rueter is an extinct town in southeastern Taney County, Missouri. The GNIS classifies it as a populated place. The town site is located at western intersection of U.S. Route 160 and Route 125. Rueter is part of the Branson, Missouri Micropolitan Statistical Area.

A post office called Rueter was established in 1906.  A variant spelling was "Reuter". One Mr. Reuter, an early postmaster, gave the community his last name.

References

Ghost towns in Missouri
Former populated places in Taney County, Missouri